Monica Pang is an American beauty pageant holder from Georgia, who was crowned Miss Georgia in 2005 and Miss America runner-up in 2006.

Education 
In 2003, Pang graduated with a degree in consumer journalism from University of Georgia. While Pang was a student at University of Georgia, she was a Hoop Girl for the men's basketball program.

In 2012, Pang started pursuing a degree in Nutrition and Dietetics from California State University, Northridge. After getting a second Bachelor's degree at CSU-Northridge, she earned a Master of Public Health degree from University of California, Los Angeles.

See also 
 Miss Georgia (U.S. state)
 Jennifer Berry-Gooden (Miss America 2006)

References

External links 
 Miss Georgia USA

American beauty pageant winners
Beauty pageant contestants from Georgia (U.S. state)
Miss America 2007 delegates
Living people
Year of birth missing (living people)